The 2001 Limerick Senior Hurling Championship was the 107th staging of the Limerick Senior Hurling Championship since its establishment by the Limerick County Board.

Patrickswell were the defending champions.

On 21 October 2001, Adare won the championship after a 2-17 to 2-08 defeat of Patrickswell in the final. It was their first ever championship title.

Results

Final

References

Limerick Senior Hurling Championship
Limerick Senior Hurling Championship